In mathematics,  primitive recursive set functions or  primitive recursive ordinal functions are analogs of primitive recursive functions, defined for sets or ordinals rather than natural numbers.

Definition

A primitive recursive set function is a function from sets to sets that can be obtained from the following basic functions by repeatedly applying the following rules of substitution and recursion:

The basic functions are:
Projection: Pn,m(x1, ..., xn) = xm for 0 ≤ m ≤ n
Zero: F(x) = 0
Adjoining an element to a set: F(x, y) = x ∪ {y}
Testing membership: C(x, y, u, v) = x if u ∈ v, and C(x, y, u, v) = y otherwise.

The rules for generating new functions by substitution are
F(x, y) = G(x, H(x), y)
F(x, y) = G(H(x), y)
where x and y are finite sequences of variables.

The rule for generating new functions by recursion is
F(z, x) = G(∪u∈z F(u, x), z, x)

A primitive recursive ordinal function is defined in the same way, except that the initial function F(x, y) = x ∪ {y} is replaced by F(x) = x ∪ {x} (the successor of x). The primitive recursive ordinal functions are the same as the primitive recursive set functions that map ordinals to ordinals.

Examples of primitive recursive set functions:
TC, the function assigning to a set its transitive closure.
Given hereditarily finite , the constant function .

Extensions
One can also add more initial functions to obtain a larger class of functions. For example, the ordinal function  is not primitive recursive, because the constant function with value ω (or any other infinite set) is not primitive recursive, so one might want to add this constant function to the initial functions.

The notion of a set function being primitive recursive in ω has the same definition as that of primitive recursion, except with ω as a parameter kept fixed, not altered by the primitive recursion schemata.

Examples of functions primitive recursive in ω: pp.28--29
.
The function assigning to  the th level  of Godel's constructible hierarchy.

Primitive recursive closure
Let Lα denote the αth stage of Godel's constructible universe. Lα is closed under primitive recursive set functions iff α is closed under each  for all .

References

Inline

Computability theory
Theory of computation
Functions and mappings
Recursion
Set theory
Ordinal numbers